Arthur Lamb (17 December 1868 – 26 July 1908) was an English cricketer.  Lamb's batting and bowling styles are unknown.  He was born at Cheltenham, Gloucestershire.

He made two first-class appearances for Gloucestershire.  The first of these came against Yorkshire in the 1895 County Championship.  His second appearance was against Lancashire in the 1896 County Championship.  Lamb had little success in either match, scoring 24 runs and taking no wickets.

He died at Cliftonville, Kent on 26 July 1908.

References

External links
Arthur Lamb at ESPNcricinfo
Arthur Lamb at CricketArchive

1868 births
1908 deaths
Sportspeople from Cheltenham
English cricketers
Gloucestershire cricketers